Gwyn Careg is a historic country estate at 68 Wolf Den Road in the Abington section of Pomfret, Connecticut.  It is currently operated as a bed and breakfast.  The main house on the property is a two-story brick structure built c. 1760, altered in the late 19th century and again in the 1920s, giving it a Colonial Revival appearance.  When the property was developed as a country estate in the 1920s by Eleanor Clark Murray (who gave the property its name), it included significant landscape design by William Jackson, a noted New York City landscape designer.  Despite a significant period of neglect in the 20th century, the property has one of the most extensive collections of specimen trees in the state.  The property was added to the National Register of Historic Places in 1994.

Description and history
Gwyn Careg is located in a rural setting of southern Pomfret, on the west side of Wolf Den Road a short way south of United States Route 44.  The surviving  of a once larger estate include the main house, gatehouse, barn, and the remains of an early 20th-century greenhouse, as well as a designed landscape containing formal and informal elements.  The main house is a frame building, built about 1760, which underwent extensive alterations in the 1890s and 1920s. Those alterations included refacing the exterior in brick veneer, which has been painted.  This structure has been encrusted with additions, including an east-facing gabled section that is its principal facade to the street.  It is set just north of the original main block, whose gable end houses the main entrance.

The gardens in which the house stand include a formal terraced area which descends from the house to a man-made lake, and a Spanish style walled garden just south of the house. The terraced garden historically was adorned with statuary and urns containing plantings, but these features have been lost, as was the original boathouse on the lake. The property was surveyed in 1991 by the Connecticut Botanical Society, in which 27 specimen trees were identified; this is one of the largest collection of such trees in the state.

See also

National Register of Historic Places listings in Windham County, Connecticut

References

Houses on the National Register of Historic Places in Connecticut
National Register of Historic Places in Windham County, Connecticut
Pomfret, Connecticut
Houses in Windham County, Connecticut